OTO Award TV Show – Entertainment

Currently held by  Milujem Slovensko – STV

First awarded  | Last awarded 2005 | Present 

OTO Award for TV Show – Entertainment has been bestowed to the most recognized television program of the past year in Slovak entertainment since 2005. The category includes various formats, such as a reality television, TV special, sitcom or else.

Winners and nominees

2000s

2010s

Superlatives

References

External links
 OTO Awards (Official website)
 OTO Awards - Winners and nominees (From 2000 onwards)
 OTO Awards - Winners and nominees (From 2000 to 2009)

Show - Entertainment
Slovak culture
Slovak television awards
Awards established in 2000